The Haryana football team is a football team of India representing Haryana in Indian state football competitions including the Santosh Trophy.

Squad
The following 22 players were called for the 2022–23 Santosh Trophy.

Honours 
 B.C. Roy Trophy
 Winners (1): 2007–08

 M. Dutta Ray Trophy
 Runners-up (1): 2010

References

Santosh Trophy teams
Football in Haryana